Chintalapalle is a village in Midthur mandal, located in Kurnool district of the Indian state of Andhra Pradesh.

References 

Villages in Kurnool district